Jim Krapf (born March 1, 1950) is a former football player who played for the BC Lions in the Canadian Football League. Previously, he played college football at the University of Alabama.

References

1950 births
Living people
BC Lions players
Alabama Crimson Tide football players